German submarine U-151 was a Type IID U-boat of Nazi Germany's Kriegsmarine during World War II. Her keel was laid down on 6 July 1940 by Deutsche Werke in Kiel as yard number 280. She was launched on 14 December 1940 and commissioned on 15 January 1941 with Kapitänleutnant Hans Oestermann in command.

U-151 began her service life with the 1st U-boat Flotilla. She was then assigned to the 22nd flotilla and subsequently to the 31st flotilla. She spent the war as a training vessel.

She was scuttled on 5 May 1945.

Design
German Type IID submarines were enlarged versions of the original Type IIs. U-151 had a displacement of  when at the surface and  while submerged. She had two shafts and two  propellers.

U-151 was fitted with three  torpedo tubes at the bow, five torpedoes or up to twelve Type A torpedo mines, and a  anti-aircraft gun. The boat had a complement of 25.

Fate

The boat surrendered at the German island of Heligoland and was scuttled in the Raederschleuse (lock) at Wilhelmshaven on 5 May 1945. The wreck was broken up on an unknown date.

References

Bibliography

External links

German Type II submarines
U-boats commissioned in 1940
World War II submarines of Germany
1940 ships
Ships built in Kiel
Operation Regenbogen (U-boat)
Maritime incidents in May 1945